The Vidya Kunj School is an English language middle school located in Navsari in Gujarat, a state in western India. It offers GSEB courses in science and commerce streams. School provides education from Nursery to Standard 12.  Established in the 1970s, it is the Second School in the city which uses English language as medium of Teaching/medium of instruction.

The schooling level is basically divided in three parts: 1. Pre-Primary 2. Primary 3. Secondary & Higher Secondary . The Pre-primary and Primary sections are Self-financed whereas the Secondary & Higher Secondary section is semi government aided.

High schools and secondary schools in Gujarat
Education in Navsari district

https://vidyakunjnavsari.in Reference